Heart Strings is a live album by Irish singer Moya Brennan. The album was released in September 2008, but was previously available to fans throughout Brennan's Spring 2008 tour of the Netherlands. It was recorded at her concerts on 21 October 2007 in the Philharmonic Hall, Liverpool, and in November 2007 in Germany. A new version featuring "Harry's Game" was released in 2009.

Versions
The version of the album available during Moya Brennan's Spring 2008 tour (as opposed to worldwide release) sounds different, mainly the strings being lower in volume. The front cover of the album also varies, with the placing of "Live with the Royal Liverpool Philharmonic Orchestra" at the bottom of the cover on the large-scale item. Finally, the track "Harry's Game" does not feature on the Spring 2008 tour item, and was added to the large distributed release.

The German and Finnish releases have an alternative cover (bottom right), as do releases in some other countries.

Track listing
 "Tapestry"
 "Perfect Time"
 "Mhorag’s Na Horo Gheallaidh"
 "Alasdair MacColla"
 "Molly Fair"
 "Sailing Away"
 "Gone Are the Days"
 "Tunes Medley" (Eleanor Plunkett, Hobknobs, Father Francis Cameron)
 "I Will Find You"
 "Merry-Go-Round"
 "No One Talks"
 "In a Lifetime"
 "Against the Wind"
 "Theme from Harry's Game" (Not on the spring 2008 version)

Release history

External links
 News related to this release - 2007–present

Moya Brennan albums
2008 live albums